The Public Prosecution Service of the Republic of Indonesia is the government agency of Indonesia authorized for conducting public prosecution in Indonesia. It has other duties and authorities over certain matters as prescribed by laws.

Structure 
The Service is structured on three levels of governance: National, Provincial, and Municipal (although formally, it is only known as Central and Regional level).

 Office of the Attorney-General, based in the national capital Jakarta, with nation-wide jurisdiction. It is headed by the Attorney-General, a state official who was appointed by, and only answers to the President. The Attorney-General also headed the entire Indonesian Public Prosecution Service.
 Provincial Prosecutor's Office, based in the provincial capital, with province-wide jurisdiction. It is headed by a chief high prosecutor.
 District Prosecutor's Office, based in the municipalities (cities and regencies), with city- and regency-wide jurisdiction. It is headed by a chief district prosecutor.
 Branch Prosecutor's Office are special prosecutor office formed by the Attorney-General's decision, subordinated to the District Prosecutor's Office. It is headed by a chief branch district prosecutor.

Powers and duties

Main Powers 
Under the 2004 Public Prosecution Service Act Article 30, the prosecutors of the Service are vested with law enforcement authority in:

 Criminal cases, of which the prosecutors:
 conduct public prosecution activities;
 execute court orders and legally-binding court sentences;
 oversee the executions of probations, conditional sentences, and paroles;
 investigate certain criminal matters as prescribed by laws;
 prepare the required documents to proceed criminal cases to trial, and order further examinations investigations if needed.
 Civil and State Administration cases, of which the prosecutors may be authorized to represent the state or the government, in the court or outside, for the duration of the proceedings.
 Public Peace and Order, of which the prosecutors:
 promote public awareness of the law;
 promote policies of the law enforcement;
 secure circulations of print-based media;
 observe any beliefs that may endanger the public and the state;
 prevent religious misuse and/or blasphemy of the faiths;
 research and develop the crime statistics.

Others 

 Article 31: Prosecutors are allowed to ask presiding judges to order convicts who are mentally compromised, physically unhealthy, or considered to be a danger to themselves, others, and the surroundings, to be held in hospitals, mental health facilities, or other facilities that may care for and secure them.
 Article 32: Prosecutors' powers may be expanded further and regulated as prescribed by laws.
 Article 33: Prosecutors are to cooperate with other law enforcement agencies and other government agencies.
 Article 34: Prosecutors may provide legal assistance toward other agencies.

2021 amendment 
Under the 2021 amendment of the Public Prosecution Service Act, new powers were added.

 Article 30A: Concerning cases involving asset recovery activity, prosecutors are authorized to track down, seize, and return said assets to the state, the victims, or rightful parties.
 Article 30B: Concerning intelligence activities of law enforcement, prosecutors are authorized to
 investigate, secure, and gather intelligences;
 establish an environment friendly to development efforts;
 cooperate with other intelligence agencies, both domestic and overseas;
 prevent activities of corruption, collusion, and nepotism; and
 conduct multimedia supervision.
 Article 30C: The Public Prosecution Service is then tasked with additional duties, as follow.
 create a crime activities statistics and a health service of the Public Prosecution Service;
 be actively involved in truth seeking of human rights violation cases;
 be actively involved in the victims and witnesses' affairs of a criminal case;
 conduct criminal mediation, asset seizure for the payment of fines, substitute penalties, and restitutions;
 provide investigative information regarding one's criminal records or criminal charges for the purpose of sitting in a public office;
 conduct other civil and/or public functions as prescribed by law;
 seize assets for the payment of fines and bails;
 request a Judicial Review of a Court Decision; and
 conduct wiretapping operation and serve as monitoring center.

List of Public Prosecutor's Offices

References 

Government agencies of Indonesia
Indonesia